The Assyrian eclipse, also known as the Bur-Sagale eclipse, is a solar eclipse recorded in Assyrian eponym lists that most likely dates to the tenth year of the reign of king Ashur-dan III.  The eclipse is identified with the one that occurred on 15 June 763 BC (proleptic Julian calendar).

The entry is short and reads:
"[year of] Bur-Sagale of Guzana. Revolt in the city of Assur. In the month Simanu an eclipse of the sun took place."
The phrase used — shamash ("the sun") akallu ("bent", "twisted", "crooked", "distorted", "obscured") — has been interpreted  as a reference to a solar eclipse since the first decipherment of cuneiform in the mid 19th century.
The name Bur-Sagale (also rendered Bur-Saggile, Pur-Sagale or Par-Sagale) is the name of the limmu official 
in the eponymous year.

In 1867, Henry Rawlinson identified the near-total eclipse of 15 June 763 BC as the most likely candidate (the month Simanu corresponding to the May/June lunation),  visible in northern Assyria just before noon. 
This date has been widely accepted ever since;  the identification is also substantiated by other astronomical observations from the same period.

This record is one of the crucial pieces of evidence that anchor the absolute chronology of the ancient Near East for the Assyrian period.

See also

 Chronology of the ancient Near East
 Akitu
 Historical astronomy
 Eclipse of Thales
 Mursili's eclipse

References

External links
 Path map of eclipses 780 BCE - 761 BCE (NASA) - Includes total eclipse of June 15, 763 BC (labeled -0762 June 15)
 Path map of eclipses 800 BCE - 781 BCE (NASA) - Includes annular eclipse of June 24, 791 BC (labeled -0790 June 24)
 Five Millennium (-1999 to +3000) Canon of Solar Eclipses Database – maps the visibility of the total solar eclipse of June 15, 763 BC.
 Five Millennium (-1999 to +3000) Canon of Solar Eclipses Database – maps the visibility of the annular solar eclipse of June 24, 791 BC.

Chronology
Solar eclipses
Ancient astronomy
Eclipse
760s BC